Pansemna is a genus of moths of the family Noctuidae.

Species
 Pansemna beryllodes (Turner, 1903)

References
Natural History Museum Lepidoptera genus database
Pansemna at funet

Hadeninae